The elephant is a large, grey mammal native to Africa and southern Asia.

Elephant may also refer to:

Arts and entertainment

Films
 Elephant (1989 film), directed by Alan Clarke
 Elephant (1993 film), a public information film about seat belt use in the UK
 Elephant (2003 film), directed by Gus Van Sant
 Elephant (2020 film), a Disney nature documentary

Music
 Elephant (album), a 2003 album by the White Stripes
 L'Éléphant, a movement of The Carnival of the Animals by Saint-Saëns
 "Elephant" (Alexandra Burke song), a 2012 song by Alexandra Burke
 "Elephant" (Margaret song), a 2016 song by Margaret
 "Elephants" (song), a 2008 song by Warpaint
 "L'Elephant", a song from the album Tom Tom Club by Tom Tom Club
 "Elephant", a song from the album 9 by Damien Rice
 "Elephant" (Tame Impala song), a 2012 song by Tame Impala and covered by the Wiggles in 2021
 "Elephants", a song from the album Them Crooked Vultures by Them Crooked Vultures
 "Elephant", a song from the 2012 album Hannah Georgas by Hannah Georgas
 "Elephant", from Excellent Italian Greyhound by Shellac
 "The Elephant Song" (song), a 1975 song by Kamahl

Other
 The Elephants (Los Elefantes), a 1948 painting by Salvador Dalí
 Elephant (short story collection), a 1988 story collection by Raymond Carver

Places

Antarctica
 Elephant Flats, Signy Island
 Elephant Island, South Shetland Islands
 Elephant Moraine, Victoria Land
 Elephant Point, Livingston Island
 Elephant Ridge, Alexander Island
 Elephant Rocks (Antarctica), Palmer Archipelago

Subantarctic
 Elephant Cays, Falkland Islands
 Elephant Cove, South Georgia
 Elephant Lagoon, South Georgia
 Elephant Spit, Heard Island

United States
 Elephant, Pennsylvania, an unincorporated community
 Elephant Arch, a sandstone formation in Utah
 Elephant Mountain (Oxford County, Maine)
 Elephant Mountain (Piscataquis County, Maine)
 Elephant Point (Alaska)

Elsewhere
 Mount Elephant, Victoria, Australia
 Dâmrei Mountains (Elephant Mountains), Cambodia
 Elephant and Castle, an area of London, England, informally called "the Elephant"
 The Elephant, a mountain in Milford Sound, New Zealand
 Elephant Rock (disambiguation)

Buildings
 Elephant Building, a high-rise in Bangkok, Thailand
 Elephant Packing House, Fullerton, California
 Edward Gorey House, also known as Elephant House, Cape Cod, Massachusetts
 Elephant Hotel, Somers, New York

Military uses
 , the name of various British Royal Navy ships
 Martinsyde G.100 "Elephant", a British First World War bomber aircraft
 103 Squadron (Israel) or the Elephants Squadron
 Operation Elephant, part of the World War II Battle for the Kapelsche Veer in the Netherlands

Business
 Elephant.co.uk, a UK motor insurance company
 Elephant Memory Systems, a computer floppy disk manufacturer
 Elephant Field, an oilfield in Libya's Murzuq Basin
 Elephant Gate and Tower, Carlsberg
 Elephant beer, a beer brewed by Carlsberg Brewery of Denmark

Sports and games
 Ivory Coast national football team, nicknamed the Elephants
 Elephant Rally, a motorcycle rally in Germany
 Elephant Gambit, a rarely used chess opening

Other uses
 Al-Fil ("The Elephant"), the 105th sura of the Qur'an
 Elephant (pharaoh), an ancient Egyptian protodynastic ruler
 Elephant seal, two species of large seals in the genus Mirounga
 Elephant (de Camp book), a science book by L. Sprague de Camp
 Elephant, a digital fat face typeface
 Elephant folio, a book size
 Order of the Elephant, the highest order of Denmark
 The Elephant, a nickname for the 426 cu in Chrysler V8 engine

See also

 
 
 , the name of various Royal Danish Navy ships
 ElePHPant, the mascot of the PHP scripting/programming language project
 Elefant (disambiguation)
 Oliphant (disambiguation), derived from an archaic spelling